Oleh Ivanovych Osukhovskyi (born 18 June 1978, Velykoselky, Lviv Oblast) is a Ukrainian politician. He is a People's Deputy of Ukraine 7th, 8th and 9th convocations.

Education
In 1995 graduated from Velykoselska Secondary School, in 2007 – graduated from Economic Faculty of Lviv National University after I.Franko; specialty – finances and credit.

Sport career
 2000–2002 – a football player of professional football club "Gazovik-Skala" (Stryi)
 2004–2005 – a mini-football player in England.

Work and political activity
2007–2008 – LTD"Mercury", the leader of transportation and marketing department in Staryi, Lviv Oblast.
 Since 2008 – the member of Public Union "Lustracia" (LTD).
 Since 2010 – president of mini-football club "Kardinal-Rivne".
 Since 2009 – "Ukrainian Community of Kyiv" LTD and a member of Public Council at Kyiv Region State Administration.
 Since 2010 – Chairperson on general questions of Public Committee on monitoring at State Committee of Entrepreneurs of Ukraine.
 Since 2012 – Deputy Director "Juridicheskaya Firma" Bondarchuk and partners" LTD.
 Since 1998 is a member of General Ukrainian Unity "Liberty".
 In 1998—2003  – assistant-consultant of Ukraine's People's Deputy Oleh Tiahnybok on public grounds.
 In 2007—2008  – Deputy of Kamianka-Buzka Regional Council of the 5th elections.
 Since 2010 —Deputy of Rivne Oblast Council of the 6th convocation, elected in single member electoral district № 40 (Rivne) from General Ukrainian Unity "Svoboda". 
 Since 2011 – Chairperson of Rivne Oblast Organisation of All Ukrainian "Liberty".

 In 2012 Oleh Ivanovych Osuhovskyi is elected People's deputy of the Verkhovna Rada of Ukraine of the 7th elections on single member electoral district № 152 (Rivne) from political party General Unity "Liberty". The Chairperson of subcommittee on the questions of international cooperation in the sphere of the fight against organized crime and terrorism and opposition to income legalization, got by criminal way of Committee on the questions of the fight against organized crime and corruption.
 During the elections to the Vekhovna Rada in 2014 he became People's Depute of Ukraine on electoral district № 152 (Rivne Region) from the party General Ukrainian Unity "Liberty". The Chairperson of subcommittee on legal support and control over the activity of special bodies in the sphere of corruption prevention and counteraction of the Verkhovna Rada of Ukraine Committee on Corruption Prevention and Counteraction.

External links

 Verkhovna Rada of Ukraine, official web portal
 Official page on Facebook

1978 births
Living people
People from Lviv Oblast
University of Lviv alumni
Ukrainian footballers
Seventh convocation members of the Verkhovna Rada
Eighth convocation members of the Verkhovna Rada
Svoboda (political party) politicians
Association footballers not categorized by position